The Ben Lightle House is a historic house at North Locust and East Market streets in Searcy, Arkansas.  It is a two-story wood-frame structure, with a variety of porches and projecting sections typical of the  Queen Anne period.  One of its porches has decorative turned posts and spindled balustrades.  Built in 1898, it is one of the best-preserved surviving vernacular Queen Anne Victorians in White County.

The house was listed on the National Register of Historic Places in 1991.

See also
Lightle House (107 North Elm Street, Searcy, Arkansas)
Lightle House (605 Race Avenue, Searcy, Arkansas)
Lightle House (County Road 76, Searcy, Arkansas)
William H. Lightle House (601 East Race Street, Searcy, Arkansas)
National Register of Historic Places listings in White County, Arkansas

References

Houses on the National Register of Historic Places in Arkansas
Queen Anne architecture in Arkansas
Houses completed in 1898
Houses in Searcy, Arkansas
National Register of Historic Places in Searcy, Arkansas
1898 establishments in Arkansas